The 2024 United States House of Representatives elections in South Carolina will be held on November 5, 2024, to elect the seven U.S. representatives from the State of South Carolina, one from each of the state's congressional districts. The elections will coincide with the 2024 U.S. presidential election, as well as other elections to the House of Representatives, elections to the United States Senate, and various state and local elections.

District 1

The 1st district straddles the Atlantic coast of the state, and includes most of Charleston. The incumbent is Republican Nancy Mace, who was re-elected with 56.4% of the vote in 2022.

Republican primary

Candidates

Potential
Nancy Mace, incumbent U.S. Representative

Democratic primary

Candidates

Declared
Michael B. Moore, businessman and former CEO of the International African American Museum

General election

Predictions

References

2024
South Carolina
United States House of Representatives